Subhyracodon (Latin: "below" (sub), + Greek: "hyrax" (hyrak = 'shrewmouse'), and "tooth" (odontos, referring to the genus Hyracodon)) is an extinct genus of hornless rhinoceroses. It coexisted with other perissodactyls such as horses, brontotheres, and chalicotheres. Subhyracodon had no horns, relying more on its speed to escape from predators, but a species found at Wind Cave National Park had a pair of bony nasal ridges. The genus Caenopus and species originally referred to as Aceratherium were synonymized into Subhyracodon.

References

External links
Wind Cave National Park page on Subhyracodon
Paleobiology Database query for Subhyracodon

Eocene rhinoceroses
Chattian genus extinctions
Oligocene rhinoceroses
White River Fauna
Eocene mammals of North America
Oligocene mammals of North America